No Reservations: Around the World on an Empty Stomach is a book by Anthony Bourdain and a companion to the television show of the same name. The book serves as a scrap book of the previous three seasons of the television show and has extensive photographs of Bourdain and his crew at work filming the series.

References

2007 non-fiction books
American travel books